Dean Peer (born 8 August 1969) is an English former footballer who played as a midfielder for a variety of clubs in the Midlands. He made more than 350 appearances in the Football League. He was born in Wordsley, near Stourbridge, Staffordshire. Peer currently works as a physiotherapist in Wolverhampton since retiring from football.

Honours
 with Birmingham City
 Leyland Daf Trophy winner 1991
 Football League Third Division (level 3) runners-up 1992
 with Northampton Town
Football League Third Division play-offs: 1997
 with Moor Green
 Clubman of the Year 2003

References

External links

Living people
1969 births
People from Wordsley
English footballers
Association football midfielders
Birmingham City F.C. players
Mansfield Town F.C. players
Walsall F.C. players
Northampton Town F.C. players
Shrewsbury Town F.C. players
Moor Green F.C. players
Solihull Borough F.C. players
Evesham United F.C. players
English Football League players